St Giles International is an English Language school group that was founded in 1955 in London, England.

Today, St Giles teaches over 14,000 students from over 100 countries   It has seven year-round schools, as well as  many Junior Summer Centres in the UK, US and Canada.

History 
St Giles International was founded in 1955 by Paul Lindsay and his wife Diana. Paul trained to be a teacher and started his career teaching English and French to native English speakers at a north London polytechnic.

Wanting to earn more money, Lindsay took a summer job at an English language school on Oxford Street, London. After observing that the school had a large number of foreign students, he decided to start his own school of English.  After saving £100, LIndsay rented a small room in a back street of Soho, London.

In 1998, Lindsay retired as Managing Director of St Giles International and was succeeded by the current Managing Director, his son, Mark Lindsay.

Schools 

St Giles International has seven year-round English language schools in three countries. They are located in the following destinations:
 Canada – Vancouver
 UK – Brighton, Eastbourne, London Central, London Highgate, and Cambridge
 US – New York City

St Giles International also operates Junior Summer Courses in  North America and England, and has year-round schools in Brazil.

The St Giles Educational Trust 
Established in 1970, the St Giles Educational Trust is a registered charity that provides St Giles’ initial teacher training courses and continuing professional development programmes for British and overseas teachers.

The Trust also undertakes research, runs a scholarship scheme and collaborates with the British Council and UK/international charities on projects to support English language teaching in developing countries.

St Giles international timeline 
 1963 - St Giles opens its Canterbury branch
 1969 - St Giles Brighton opens as the Brighton Overseas Students Centre
 1975 - St Giles opens its Highgate branch at 51 Shepherd's Hill, London, UK.
 1978 - St Giles Eastbourne opens.
 1982 - The first overseas branch of St Giles opens in San Francisco.
 1986 - St Giles purchases a new building in Marlborough Place, Brighton
 1987 - St Giles Westminster opened in Northumberland Avenue, London
 1991 - St Giles transfers to larger premises on Hallidie Plaza, San Francisco.
 1993 - St Giles Westminster moves to larger premises in Great Russell Street renaming to St Giles London Central.
 1997 - St Giles London Central moves to its current location at 154 Southampton Row.
 2001 - St Giles opens its first centre in São Paulo, Brazil.
 2004 - St Giles Campinas opens in Campinas, Brazil
 2005 - St Giles opens a Summer Course for young learners in Southampton. (Since then it has opened eight more courses in the UK, as well as five in the US and two in Canada).
 2006 - St Giles San Francisco moves to a new building located on Market Street.
 2006 - St Giles takes over the Canadian Business English Institute (CBEI), reopening as St Giles, Vancouver.
 2009 - St Giles San Francisco expands into a second building, nicknamed 'NOMA' (North of Market Street) opposite its current building, 'SOMA'.
 2011 - St Giles opens its New York City year-round centre on Fifth Avenue.
 2019 - St Giles closes its San Francisco centre.

References

 El Gazette - References St Giles International History, Founders and general operation.
 The British Council - Inspection report information and accreditation.
 CEA - Accreditation
 Independent Schools Inspectorate (ISI)- Educational oversight inspection of private further education and English language colleges, extended monitoring visit, St Giles Brighton.

External links
 

Language schools
Multinational companies
International business